A grater, also known as a shredder, is a kitchen utensil used to grate foods into fine pieces.

Uses

Food preparation

Several types of graters feature different sizes of grating slots, and can therefore aid in the preparation of a variety of foods. They are commonly used to grate vegetables, cheese and lemon or orange peel (to create zest), spices, such as ginger and nutmeg, and can also be used to grate other soft foods. They are commonly used in the preparation of toasted cheese, Welsh rarebit, egg salad, and dishes which contain cheese sauce such as macaroni and cheese, cauliflower cheese.

In Slavic cuisine, graters are commonly used to grate potatoes for preparation of dishes, including draniki, bramborak or potato babka.

In tropical countries graters are also used to grate coconut meat. In the Indian subcontinent, the grater is used for preparation of a popular dessert, Gajar Ka Halwa.

Graters produce shreds that are thinner at the ends than the middle. This allows the grated material to melt or cook in a different manner than the shreds of mostly uniform thickness produced by the grating blade of a food processor. Hand-grated potatoes, for example, melt together more easily in a potato pancake than food-processed potato shreds.

In music
In Jamaica and Belize, coconut graters are used as a traditional musical instrument (along with drums, fife, and other instruments) in the performance of kumina, jonkanoo, and sometimes mento.

History
The first attested graters were made out of bronze, and also silver alloys, in the early first millennium BCE, examples of which were uncovered from burial sites in Greece and Etruscan Italy. In line with Homer's Iliad these were sometimes used to grate goat's cheese in the making of a type of Kykeon, a fast breaking drink. The modern cheese grater was invented in France in the 1540s by François Boullier. His pewter design was intended to convert hard cheeses into something more edible.

Variants
Spiralizers are complex food-processing machines with grater-like mechanisms. These mechanisms rotate by the turn of a cluster to produce ribbons or noodles.

Images

In popular culture
 Kevin Eastman, co-creator of the Teenage Mutant Ninja Turtles, got the idea for the Shredder's armor from large cheese graters which he envisioned on a villainous character's arms to be used as weapons. Originally called "Grate Man", the Shredder is known as the primary antagonist in the TMNT franchise.
 Wisconsin sports fans are often called cheeseheads, and some wear cheese hats. In 2013, sports fans of Chicago and Minnesota replied to their rivals by wearing cheese graters.

See also
 Food processor an appliance that sometimes has a grating blade
 Mandoline
 Oroshigane
 Surform
 Tamis
 Soap grater

References

Food preparation utensils
French inventions